
Gmina Baligród is a rural gmina (administrative district) in Lesko County, Subcarpathian Voivodeship, in south-eastern Poland.

The gmina contains part of the protected area called Cisna-Wetlina Landscape Park.

Villages
Gmina Baligród contains the villages and settlements of Baligród, Bystre, Cisowiec, Jabłonki, Kiełczawa, Kołonice, Łubne, Mchawa, Nowosiółki, Rabe, Roztoki Dolne, Stężnica, Zahoczewie, Żerdenka, Żernica Niżna and Żernica Wyżna.

Neighbouring gminas
Gmina Baligród is bordered by the gminas of Cisna, Komańcza, Lesko, Solina and Zagórz.

References
Polish official population figures 2006

Rural landscape picture

Baligrod
Lesko County